Network: Computation in Neural Systems is a scientific journal that aims to provide a forum for integrating theoretical and experimental findings in computational neuroscience with a particular focus on neural networks. The journal is published by Taylor & Francis and edited by Dr Simon Stringer (University of Oxford).

Network: Computation In Neural Systems was established in 1990, has an impact factor of 0.562  and a 5-year impact factor of 0.774. It is published 4 times a year.

References 

Neuroscience journals
Taylor & Francis academic journals
Quarterly journals
Publications established in 1990
English-language journals